Pete Izumikawa (born 4 May 1956) is a Japanese professional golfer.

Izumikawa played on the Japan Golf Tour, winning four times.

Professional wins (4)

Japan Golf Tour wins (4)

*Note: The 1982 Suntory Open was shortened to 54 holes due to bad weather.

Team appearances
World Cup (representing Japan): 1982

External links

Japanese male golfers
Japan Golf Tour golfers
Sportspeople from Okinawa Prefecture
1956 births
Living people
20th-century Japanese people